Huwei Township is an urban township in Yunlin County, Taiwan. It has a population of about 70,300.

Name
In the 17th century, during the Dutch era, Favorolang was one of the largest and most powerful aboriginal villages in Taiwan. The name has also been spelled Favorlang, Favorlangh, and Vovorollang. Its location was north of Tirosen (modern-day Chiayi), and the Favorlang river had been called by the Chinese How-boe-khe during the reign of the Qing Yongzheng Emperor (ca. 1722 – 1735). The Chinese name for the area was later changed to Go-keng-chhu.

The name Favorlang is said to have derived from the ethnonym Babuza, a tribe of the Taiwanese Plains Aborigines.

Government

Administrative divisions

There are 29 villages:

Local government
 Taiwan Yunlin District Court

Economy
 Huwei Sugar Factory

Education
 National Formosa University

Tourist attractions

 Huwei Sugar Factory Iron Bridge
 SL Towel Industrial Tourism and Explore Factory
 Tongxin Park
 Yunlin Hand Puppet Museum
 Yunlin Story House

Transportation

The township houses the Taiwan High Speed Rail (THSR) Yunlin Station.

Famous residents
Gilbertus Happart

Sister city relations
  Ōma, Aomori Prefecture, Japan

Notable natives
 Chen Po-chih, Minister of the Council for Economic Planning and Development (2000–2002)
 Frankie Huang, actor and television host

References

External links

 Huwei Township Office 

Townships in Yunlin County